Jan Lambrichs (21 June 1915 – 28 January 1990) was a Dutch racing cyclist. He finished eighth in the 1939 Tour de France and third in the 1946 Vuelta a España.

References

External links
 

1915 births
1990 deaths
Dutch male cyclists
Sportspeople from Maastricht
Dutch Vuelta a España stage winners
People from Bunde
Cyclists from Limburg (Netherlands)